Catholicos Asdvadzadur was the Catholicos of the Armenian Apostolic Church between 1715 and 1725.

As Catholicos, he secured an alliance with Peter the Great of Russia for aid against the expansionist Muslim powers of the Ottoman Empire and Persia prior to the Russo-Persian War.

He is buried at St. Hripsime Church, Echmiadzin.

Further reading 
"The Armenian Rebellion of the 1720s and the Threat of Genocidal Reprisal", Armen Ayvazyan 

Catholicoi of Armenia
1725 deaths
Armenian Oriental Orthodox Christians
Burials at Saint Hripsime Church
Year of birth unknown